Dmytro "Dima" Filippov (born 4 December 1990) is a Greek volleyball player of Ukrainian descent. He is part of the Greece men's national volleyball team. On club level he plays for Volley Amriswil.

References

External links
 profile at FIVB.org
 

1990 births
Living people
Greek men's volleyball players
Olympiacos S.C. players
VC Lokomotyv Kharkiv players
Greek people of Ukrainian descent
Greek expatriate sportspeople in Romania
Expatriate volleyball players in Romania
Sportspeople from Luhansk
Competitors at the 2018 Mediterranean Games
Mediterranean Games bronze medalists for Greece
Mediterranean Games medalists in volleyball
Jastrzębski Węgiel players